The molecular formula C6H10N2O2 (molar mass: 142.16 g/mol, exact mass: 142.0742 u) may refer to:

 Piracetam
 Ectoine (1,4,5,6-tetrahydro-2-methyl-4-pyrimidinecarboxylic acid)

Molecular formulas